Jonathan Tehau is a Tahitian footballer currently playing for A.S. Central Sport. He is the brother of twins Lorenzo Tehau and Alvin Tehau and cousin of Teaonui Tehau, all playing for Tahiti national football team. He is a full-time member of the Tahiti national football team.

International

2012 OFC Nations Cup
Tehau was selected in the 23-man Tahiti by head coach Eddy Etaeta for the 2012 OFC Nations Cup. He featured heavily in the tournament playing mainly at centre back, he scored his first international goal against Samoa in the first group A game of the tournament, he later scored another goal in that game which eventually finished 10-1 to Tahiti and scored two more goals against Vanuatu in the final game of group A and against Solomon Islands in the semi-finals of the tournament. He also played in the final of the tournament against New Caledonia. The game finished 1-0 to Tahiti with the only goal of the game being scored by Steevy Chong Hue, thus recording the first ever victory in the OFC Nations Cup for Tahiti.

2013 FIFA Confederations Cup
Tehau was again included in the 23-man Tahiti squad for the 2013 FIFA Confederations Cup along with his brothers Alvin Tehau, Lorenzo Tehau and cousin Teaonui Tehau. On 17 June 2013 in Tahiti's first game of the tournament against Nigeria, Jonathan Tehau scored Tahiti's first ever goal at a Confederations Cup in the 54th minute, a back post header from a corner delivered by Marama Vahirua, reducing the deficit to 1–3 and sending the Tahiti bench into raptures. Tehau also scored an own goal 15 minutes after he scored in that game that eventually finished 6-1 to Nigeria, making him the first person to score at both ends in Confederations Cup history. He played in Tahiti's remaining two games in the tournament against Spain and Uruguay.

International goals
Scores and results list Tahiti's goal tally first.

Honours

Tahiti
OFC Nations Cup: 2012

International career statistics
As of 28 March 2017.

References

External links
 

1988 births
Living people
French Polynesian footballers
Tahiti international footballers
2012 OFC Nations Cup players
2013 FIFA Confederations Cup players
Association football defenders
Association football midfielders